Fatal bear attacks in North America have occurred in a variety of settings. There have been several in the bears' wilderness habitats involving hikers, hunters, and campers. Brown bear (Ursus arctos),  (a subspecies of which are known as grizzly bears, Ursus arctos horribilis) incidents have occurred in their native range spanning Alaska, Northern and Western Canada, and portions of the Rocky Mountains in the United States. The locations of black bear wilderness fatal attacks reflect their wider range.

Bears held captive by animal trainers, in zoos, carnivals, or kept as pets have been responsible for several attacks. There have also been unusual cases in which a person entered a bear's cage and was then mauled.

Bear attacks are rare in North America. Attacks are for predatory, territorial, or protective reasons. Most wilderness attacks have occurred when there were only one or two people in the vicinity.

In this list, three species of bear are recognized: the brown bear (Ursus arctos, a subspecies of which is commonly known as the grizzly bear), the black bear (Ursus americanus), and the polar bear (Ursus maritimus).

2020s

Black bear

Brown bear

Polar Bear

2010s

Black bear

Brown bear

Polar bear

2000s

Black bear

Brown bear

1990s

Black bear

Brown bear

Polar bear

1980s

Black bear

Brown bear

Polar bear

1970s

Black bear

Brown bear

Polar bear

1960s

Black bear

Brown bear

Polar bear

1950s

Black bear

Brown bear

1940s

Black bear

Brown bear

1930s

Black bear

Brown bear

1920s

Black bear

Brown bear

1910s

Brown bear

1900s

Black bear

1890s

Brown bear

1880s

Black bear

Brown bear

1870s

Brown bear

1860s

Brown bear

1850s

Brown bear

1830s

Brown bear

1780s

Black bear

Maps

See also 
Bear attacks
Bear danger
Binky (polar bear)
Stephen Herrero

Species:
 List of fatal cougar attacks in North America
 List of fatal alligator attacks in the United States
 Coyote attacks on humans
 List of wolf attacks in North America
 Fatal dog attacks in the United States

References

Bears

Lists of deaths due to animal attacks in the United States
bear